Lorraine Apartments may refer to:

Lorraine Apartments (Anaconda, Montana), listed on the National Register of Historic Places in Deer Lodge County, Montana
Lorraine Apartments (Philadelphia, Pennsylvania), listed on the National Register of Historic Places in Philadelphia County, Pennsylvania